Paige Moss (born January 30, 1973 in Washington, District of Columbia) is an American stage, film and television actress.

Background 
Moss was born in Washington, District of Columbia and raised in Abilene, Texas. While in high school, Moss was a Senate page for Senator Tim Wirth, and interned for Congressman Vic Fazio.

Moss also auditioned for the summer drama program at the Kennedy Center in Washington, D.C.  She returned to her home in Abilene to complete her senior year of high school, but instead opted to get her GED in order to enter college early. At George Mason University in Virginia she majored in theater, but transferred to the American Academy of Dramatic Arts in Los Angeles, California.

Career
Moss has had numerous roles in film and on television since 1995, and is best known for her portrayal of Tara Marks, the crazy girl who tried to kill Kelly Taylor on Beverly Hills, 90210 in its 1996 season, and for her performance as the female werewolf Veruca in three episodes of the cult TV series Buffy the Vampire Slayer in 1999. Creator and show runner, Joss Whedon, originally intended for Oz, Willow  and Veruca to be involved in a love triangle spanning most of the fourth season. However, Seth Green's abrupt decision to leave the show ultimately prevented these plans from coming to fruition. She is also known for her work as Maddy O'Neil in 20 episodes of the ABC show It's All Relative from 2002 through 2004, and for voice roles in the animated series American Dragon: Jake Long (2007) and Random! Cartoons (2008).

Filmography

Film

Television

References

External links

1973 births
Actresses from Texas
American television actresses
Living people
People from Abilene, Texas
American Academy of Dramatic Arts alumni
21st-century American women